William Walker Kennedy, MC, QC (1882 – February 10, 1963) was a Manitoba politician and lawyer.

He was born in Leeds County, Ontario and educated at Queen's University in Kingston, Ontario. He moved to Manitoba in 1904 where he worked as a journalist for two years before entering the University of Manitoba's law school. After earning his law degree he was called to the bar in 1909.

Kennedy joined the Canadian Expeditionary Force in November 1915, and went to France with the  46th Battalion in May 1917. He was wounded and awarded the Military Cross for his service at the Battle of Passchendaele and was decorated for the Battle of Valenciennes. He was given field promotions to captain and then major before being discharged in 1919.

He was elected to the House of Commons of Canada as the MP for Winnipeg South Centre as a Conservative in the 1925 federal election but defeated the next year in the 1926 federal election.

Kennedy was returned to Parliament again in the 1930 federal election and served as Chairman of the Royal Commission on Price Spreads and Mass Buying which was commissioned by Prime Minister R.B. Bennett to investigate complaints made by one of his cabinet members H.H. Stevens.

Kennedy lost his seat in the 1940 federal election and was defeated a final time in the 1945 election.

Electoral history

External links

Manitoba Historical Society biography

1882 births
1963 deaths
Conservative Party of Canada (1867–1942) MPs
Members of the House of Commons of Canada from Manitoba
Canadian Expeditionary Force officers
Recipients of the Military Cross
Canadian King's Counsel